The largest employers in India include companies, the military, railway and the government. To keep the list manageable in length, only those companies/employers which have at least 100,000 employees are included in the list.

Largest employers 

Both private and public companies are included in this list.

See also

 List of Indian IT companies
 List of largest companies in India
 List of companies of India
 Lists of occupations
 List of largest United States–based employers globally
 List of wealthiest organizations

References

Employees
Economy-related lists of superlatives
Employers